Falconer is a 1977 novel by American short story writer and novelist John Cheever. It tells the story of Ezekiel Farragut, a university professor and drug addict who is serving time in Falconer State Prison for the murder of his brother. Farragut struggles to retain his humanity in the prison environment, and begins an affair with a fellow prisoner.

Reception
Kirkus Reviews called Cheever's prose "an amazingly flexible instrument" and summarized the novel as "a strong fix—a statement of the human condition, a parable of salvation." Reviewing the book in 1977 for The New York Times, Joan Didion wrote, "On its surface 'Falconer' seems at first to be a conventional novel of crime and punishment and redemption—a story about a man who kills his brother, goes to prison for it and escapes, changed for the better—and yet the 'crime' in this novel bears no more relation to the 'punishment' than the punishment bears to the redemption. The surface here glitters and deceives. Causes and effects run deeper."

Time magazine included the novel in its list of the 100 best novels from 1923 to 2005.

Adaptations 

In 2009, Audible.com produced an audio version of Falconer, narrated by Jay Snyder, as part of its Modern Vanguard line of audiobooks.

References

External links
 In Review by Dave Latham 
 Slate. "A Story in Every Cell"

1977 American novels
Prison sexuality
Novels by John Cheever
Alfred A. Knopf books
Novels with gay themes
Sexuality in novels